Spot is a fictional puppy created by Eric Hill, an English author and illustrator of children's picture books. The success of Hill's books about Spot led to other media productions, including television and home video titles, music albums, and CD-ROM titles.

History
First published in 1980, Where's Spot? was inspired while Hill was working in creative marketing; he noticed his three-year-old son was fascinated by the process of lifting up a paper, on a design he was creating. Captivated by this thought, Hill created a story about a puppy which incorporated the flap design. During the late 1970s, this was an extraordinarily innovative concept, and it took some time for any publisher to take any notice of the idea before Puffin books decided to publish his book.  Within weeks of the first book being released it topped the Bestseller list.

Hill said "When I first drew Spot I realised that when I came to draw the spot on his body and the tip of his tail I was copying the markings on an aircraft. I grew up drawing aircraft – that is how I learned to draw. "I am quite convinced now, as I look back, that the actual training of drawing cartoons – which is, of course, my style – led to my producing Spot. Cartoons must be very simple and have as few words as possible and so must the Spot books. I designed Spot out of my previous background as a designer and illustrator. It was quite unconscious but I can see now that I have created a ready-made trademark of its kind, with the essential spot on the body and a bit on the tail."

Over time, the book was translated into more than sixty languages. In Afrikaans versions of the book Spot is translated to "Otto", widely believed to be the surname of a South African friend of Hill's. This name has been attributed to Spot as many of the books were believed to be inspired by the life of aforementioned friend, J. Otto. In the Netherlands, Spot is known as Dribbel.

Characters

Main characters
 Spot: The protagonist of the series. A yellow puppy with a brown spot on each side of his body and a brown tip on his tail, Spot appears to be a mixed breed; since his mother is a beagle, a pointer, a Dalmatian, or a St. Bernard and his father is a Labrador or a golden retriever. Spot is full of curiosity, helpfulness, and a huge desire to learn.
 Sally: Spot's mother. She is also yellow and has a brown spot on her back that goes around the back of her body, as well as two brown spots on each side of her body and a brown tip on her tail. For this description, Sally appears to be a beagle, a pointer, a Dalmatian, or a St. Bernard. Much of the first story, Where's Spot?, involves her going around the house looking for Spot.
 Sam: Spot's father. He is also yellow, but without any spots on his body. For this description, Sam appears to be a Labrador or a golden retriever.
 Susie: Spot's little sister, she is yellow but has a brown spot on her back. Like her big brother Spot, Susie also appears to be a mixed breed; since her mother is a beagle, a pointer, a Dalmatian, or a St. Bernard and her father is a Labrador or a golden retriever.
 Helen: A blue hippo who is Spot's best friend. Her colour is dark blue and she has sags under her eyes in the first series of The Adventures of Spot. Starting with later episodes of series one, she is redesigned with a more youthful and less intimidating appearance, turning light blue and losing the sags under her eyes. Starting with series two, she becomes an ever lighter shade of blue.
 Steve: A brown monkey with a tan face, he is playful and full of surprises.
 Tom: A green crocodile who is Spot's third best friend. He started out dark green in colour and has white eye sacs in the first series. He also sports rather sharp-looking incisors and a red colouring inside his mouth on the first series of The Adventures of Spot. Starting with later episodes of the first series, similar to Helen, he is also redesigned with a more youthful and less intimidating appearance, losing the sharp incisors and white eye sacs. Starting with the second series, he also turns to a lighter shade of green. He loves going fishing. Tom loves the drum, considered to be his favourite instrument. His dad is the mayor of the town.

Supporting characters

Grandma: Spot's maternal grandmother and Sally's mother. She appears in the book Spot Visits His Grandparents and the video Spot and his Grandparents Go to the Carnival. 
Grandpa: Spot's maternal grandfather and Sally's father. He appears in the book Spot Visits His Grandparents and the video Spot and his Grandparents Go to the Carnival.  
Miss Bear: A brown bear, she is Spot's preschool teacher. She first appeared in Spot Goes to School.

Minor characters
 Billy: A brown bear who loves to eat. He appears in the first series of The Adventures of Spot. In the books, he appears in Spot's Birthday Party. 
 Betsy: A brown bear. She only appears in Spot Goes to the Circus. She is one of the characters who takes Spot's ball. And when Spot asks for it, she says, "Sorry. This one is mine."
 Clare: A green turtle. She is one of Spot's classmates and appears in Spot Goes to School. She is the only other girl in Spot's nursery/preschool class besides Helen. 
 Sybil: An orange cat who is the series' antagonist. She has a very rude personality, as seen in episodes Spot's Lost Bone and Spot's First Walk as well as the Spot's First Walk book based with the TV episode where she scares Spot. She appears only in the first series of The Adventures of Spot. In the U.S., her rude personality was toned down.
 Mr. Kangaroo: Spot's neighbour, a brown kangaroo that speaks in an Australian accent since kangaroos are a native animal of Australia. He appears only in the first series of The Adventures of Spot.
 Leo: An orange lion.
 Sidney: A yellowish-green snake.
 Steve's Mom: Steve's mom. Appears only in Spot Sleeps Over. She is voiced by Linda Gary.
 The Mayor: Tom's dad. He only appeared in Spot Goes to the Carnival.

Books
Since 1980 with the success of Where's Spot?, the late Eric Hill went on to create numerous other books, with most being translated to Welsh (as well as the TV series, commissioned by S4C), some have also been translated into Scottish Gaelic, and Where's Spot? has been translated into Cornish.

 Where's Spot? (1980)
 Spot's First Walk (1981)
 Spot's Birthday Party (1982)
 Spot Goes to School (1984)
 Spot Goes on Holiday (1985)
 Spot Goes to the Farm (1987)
 Spot's First Easter (1988)
 Spot's Goes to a Party (1992)
 Spot Visits his Grandparents (1996)

List of Spot sound books
In the 1990s a number of books were released with sound effect, produced by Publications International and published by Frederick Warne. The U.S. edition of the sound books were somewhat different from the U.K. editions of the book. The text in these editions is slightly altered, and in some cases, the title is changed as well. They are produced and published by Publications International.

Book design
The books are set in the typeface Century Schoolbook Infant, a very rare, single-story version of Century Schoolbook.

Television
With the success of the books the BBC commissioned an animated series, which first appeared on 9 April 1987; with Paul Nicholas providing the narration, and renarrated in 2000 by Jane Horrocks. The series aired on television channel across the world, including RTÉ in Ireland, with the series dubbed into an Irish language with the title Echtrai Bhrain. A DVD version was released in Japan in 2005 with Japanese, English and Instrumental sound tracks. The DVDs used the same name for Spot as the books in Japan, that being コロちゃん (Korochan)

The Adventures of Spot: series 1 (1987)
The first series of The Adventures of Spot, which was animated and produced by King Rollo Films, aired on the BBC between 9 April and 17 July 1987. It consisted of 13 episodes, each 5 minutes long. The episodes were narrated by Paul Nicholas (original version) and the music was composed by Duncan Lamont (original version). 
 
Episodes in this series:

 "Spot's Surprise Parcel" (9 April 1987)
 "Spot's Lost Bone" (16 April 1987)
 "Spot's First Walk" (23 April 1987)
 "Spot in the Woods" (30 April 1987)
 "Spot's Birthday Party" (7 May 1987)
 "Where's Spot?" (14 May 1987)
 "Sweet Dreams, Spot" (20 May 1987)

 "Spot Goes to School" (28 May 1987)
 "Spot Goes to the Circus" (4 June 1987)
 "Spot Follows His Nose" (11 June 1987)
 "Spot Goes Splash" (18 June 1987)
 "Spot's Windy Day" (16 July 1987)
 "Spot Goes to the Beach" (17 July 1987)

The Adventures of Spot: series 2 (1993)
The second series of The Adventures of Spot aired between 6 September and 20 December 1993, and, like the first series, consisted of 13 5-minute episodes. Once again, the episodes were produced by King Rollo Films. Paul Nicholas (original version) returned as the voices and Duncan Lamont (original version) returned as composer of the music.

Episodes in this series:

 "Spot Goes to the Farm" (6 September 1993)
 "Spot Sleeps Over" (9 September 1993)
 "Spot Makes a Cake" (13 September 1993)
 "Spot Goes to the Park" (16 September 1993)
 "Spot Finds a Key" (20 September 1993)
 "Spot in the Garden" (23 September 1993)
 "Spot Goes to a Party" (27 September 1993)

 "Spot's Winter Sports" (15 November 1993)
 "Spot Goes to the Fair" (22 November 1993)
 "Spot's Favorite Toy" (29 November 1993)
 "Spot's First Picnic" (6 December 1993)
 "Spot at the Playground" (13 December 1993)
 "Storytime with Spot" (20 December 1993)

Spot's Musical Adventures (2000)
Spot's Musical Adventures, very similar to The Adventures of Spot, aired between 25 October and 10 November 2000. Like The Adventures of Spot, this series consisted of thirteen episodes, but this time, with a short song in them. The format of the series reverted to the narration format used prior to the specials. For these episodes, however, comedian Jane Horrocks was given the role of the narration and voices, instead of Paul Nicholas. The episodes and the songs were all written by Andrew Brenner, and the songs were performed by American London-based actor Dan Russell. The music was also composed by Kick Production.

Episodes:

 "Spot's Show" (25 October 2000)
 "Spot's Treehouse" (26 October 2000)
 "Spot's Breakfast" (27 October 2000)
 "Spot's Horse" (released in the U.S. as "Spot's Hobby Horse") (30 October 2000)
 "Spot's Grandpa" (31 October 2000)
 "Spot's Umbrella" (1 November 2000)
 "Spot's Band" (2 November 2000)

 "Spot's Bath" (3 November 2000)
 "Spot's Tent" (6 November 2000)
 "Spot Tidies Up" (released in the U.S. as "Spot Cleans Up") (7 November 2000)
 "Spot Helps Grandma" (8 November 2000)
 "Spot's School Trip" (9 November 2000)
 "Hide and Seek" (released in the U.S. as "Spot Plays Hide and Seek") (10 November 2000)

Home Video release specials 
A number of special produced VHS were created:

It's Fun to Learn with Spot – Phase 1 (1990)
The first phase of It's Fun to Learn With Spot, produced by Spitfire Television and Living Doll Productions and where released on VHS. It consisted of four episodes, each approximately fifteen minutes in length, and narrated by Peter Hawkins. The theme song used in The Adventures of Spot was licensed from King Rollo Films, so the familiar tune by Duncan Lamont was heard at the beginning and end of each episode. However, music on the show was kept to a minimum.
 "Spot's Alphabet" 
 "Spot's Busy Year"
 "Spot Learns to Count" 
 "Spot Tells the Time"

It's Fun to Learn with Spot – Phase 2 (1994)
The second phase of It's Fun to Learn With Spot and, like the first VHS, consisted of four fifteen-minute episodes. However the episodes were produced by King Rollo Films and retained the talents of Paul Nicholas and Duncan Lamont, in UK.

Episodes in this series:
 "Spot Looks at Opposites" 
 "Spot's First Word Game" 
 "Spot Looks at Colours" 
 "Spot Looks at Shapes"

Note: The two phases of It's Fun to Learn with Spot are often listed as one series, even on Penguin Television's website. However, as noted, the two phases were produced four years apart by two different companies and are very different in design.

Spot's Magical Christmas was released in 1995 and Spot and his Grandparents Go to the Carnival in 1997. These two specials, which are both thirty minutes long, have some notable differences from the normal series. First off, they have no narration, and each character is voiced distinctly. The characters' mouths also move to speech, in comparison to the other episodes, in which the characters' mouths remain static and the entire episode is narrated as a story. There are also several songs in the specials, as there were in It's Fun to Learn With Spot.

Voices
Calum Neilsen – Spot (Spot's Magical Christmas)
Tom Fletcher – Spot (Spot and his Grandparents Go to the Carnival)
Josie Lawrence – Sally/Helen
Paul Nicholas – Sam (Spot's Magical Christmas)
Philip Pope – Tom
Steve Steen – Sam (Spot and his Grandparents Go to the Carnival)/Steve
Steve Frost – Reindeer #1
Lee Cornes – Reindeer #2
Andy Paresi – Santa Claus
Carol MacReady – Grandma
Rob Inglis – Grandpa

U.S. Cast
The original The Adventures of Spot series was distributed in the United States by Disney. Rather than have a singular narrator, the series featured unique character voices.
Corey Burton – Narrator/Sam/Tom/Steve/Spot's Grandpa/Various
Linda Gary – Sally/Miss Bear/Betsy/Helen/Claire/Tina/Sybil/Various 
Jonathan Taylor Thomas, Ryan O'Donohue and Haley Joel Osment – Spot 
Shaun Fleming – (Singing Voice) – Spot
Tress MacNeille – Helen/Sally/Female Reindeer/Spot's Grandma/Various 
Jim Cummings – Male Reindeer/Santa Claus

Other media

Music albums
A number of companies have released a number of CDs featuring mainly nursery rhymes, under the name of "The Spot".

 Spot in the Park with the Flowerpot Gang Released in Australia by the Australian Broadcasting Corporation in the early 2000s, Spot in the Park with the Flowerpot Gang consists of 26 nursery rhymes. Apparently, it is no longer published.
 Spot's First Play Songs Published by Genius Entertainment and is also available in a box set titled Spot's Favorite Toddler Tunes (although in this edition, The Alphabet Song is excluded).
 Spot's Farmyard Friends It is also published by Genius Entertainment and is also available in the Spot's Favorite Toddler Tunes box set.
 Spot's Classics for Growing Minds Bidding on the success of the controversial Mozart Effect, Spot's Classics for Growing Minds contains twelve classical numbers from various classical composers. Also published by Genius Entertainment, this album has also made its appearance in the Spot's Favorite Toddler Tunes box set.

CD-ROMs
Two Spot CD-ROM titles were published by Europress and Hasbro Interactive. Both titles runs on both Microsoft Windows (Windows 95 or NT4 or newer) and Apple Macintosh (OS 8 up to Mac OS X Leopard) computers.

References

External links
 Fun with Spot official website

Book series introduced in 1980
BBC children's television shows
Animated television series about dogs
Characters in children's literature
1987 British television series debuts
2000 British television series endings
1980s British children's television series
1990s British children's television series
2000s British children's television series
1980s British animated television series
1990s British animated television series
2000s British animated television series
Disney Channel original programming
Treehouse TV original programming
Australian Broadcasting Corporation original programming
British television shows based on children's books
English-language television shows
Television shows about dogs
Books about dogs
Fictional dogs